After :World War II there were from 524,000 Japanese personnel in the Soviet Union and Mongolia interned to work in labor camps as POWs. Of them, it is estimated that 60,000 died in captivity.

The majority of the approximately 3.5 million Japanese armed forces outside Japan were disarmed by the United States and Kuomintang China and repatriated in 1946. Western Allies had taken 35,000 Japanese prisoners between December 1941 and 15 August 1945, i.e., before the Japanese capitulation The Soviet Union held the Japanese POWs in a much longer time period and used them as a labor force.

Soviet Union behavior was contrary to the Soviet–Japanese Neutrality Pact from the beginning, and also to the Potsdam Declaration, which guaranteed the return of surrendered Japanese soldiers to Japan.
When Russian President Boris Yeltsin arrived in Japan in October 1993, he apologized for being an "inhumane act."

However, the Russian side said, "The transferred Japanese soldiers are" prisoners of war "who were legally detained during the battle and do not fall into the category of" detainees "who were unfairly detained after the end of the war."

History
The majority of Japanese who were held in the Soviet Union did not consider themselves as "Prisoners of War" and referred to themselves as "internees", because they voluntarily laid down their arms after the official capitulation of Japan, i.e., after the end of the military conflict. The number of Japanese prisoners captured in combat was very small.

After the defeat of the Kwantung Army in Manchuria, Japanese POWs were sent from Manchuria, Korea, South Sakhalin and Kuril Islands to Primorski Krai, Khabarovsk Krai, Krasnoyarsk Krai, Kazakhstan (South Kazakhstan Province and Zhambyl Province), Buryat-Mongol ASSR, and Uzbek SSR. In 1946, 49 labor camps for Japanese POWs under the management of GUPVI housed about 500,000 persons. In addition there were two camps for those convicted of various crimes. Prisoners were grouped into 1,000 person units. Some male and female Japanese civilians, as well as Koreans were also imprisoned when there were not enough soldiers to fill a unit.

Handling of Japanese POWs was, in line with the USSR State Defense Committee Decree no. 9898cc "About Receiving, Accommodation, and Labor Utilization of the Japanese Army Prisoners of War" ("О приеме, размещении, трудовом использовании военнопленных японской армии") dated by 23 August 1945.

A significant number of Japanese were assigned to the construction of the Baikal-Amur Mainline (over 200,000 persons), in eight camps, in Komsomolsk-on-Amur (two camps, for two railroad branches), Sovetskaya Gavan, Raychikha railroad station (Khabarovsk Krai), Izvestkovaya railroad station (Khabarovsk Krai), Krasnaya Zarya (Chita Oblast), Taishet, and Novo-Grishino (Irkutsk Oblast).

The repatriation of Japanese POWs started in 1946.

Beginning in 1949, there were reports of returnees being uncooperative and hostile upon returning to Japan, owing to Communist propaganda they had been subject to during their imprisonment. These incidents resulted in the Japanese public gaining a more negative perception of the returning soldiers, and increased SCAP's hostility towards the left-wing in Japan.

Those remaining after 1950 were detained having been convicted of various crimes. Their release continued from 1953 under various amnesties. Following the death of Josef Stalin and the subsequent Khruschev Thaw, the Soviet attitude towards the remaining Japanese prisoners changed significantly. Accompanied by Soviet officials, they were taken on tours of cities and allowed to purchase gifts for their families. Prior to repatriation, a banquet in Khabarovsk hosted by Nikolai Gagen was attended by high-ranking prisoners such as Jun Ushiroku. The last major group of 1,025 Japanese POWs was released on 23 December 1956. 

From then on, some Japanese POWs were released in small groups, including those who would only return in the 1990s following the collapse of the Soviet Union. Some Japanese prisoners who had been held for decades, who by this point had married and had started families, elected not to permanently return to Japan.

There are about 60 associations of Japanese former internees and members of their families today. The Soviet Union did not provide the lists of POWs and did not allow the relatives of those POWs who died in captivity to visit their burial sites. This became possible after the dissolution of the Soviet Union.

Japanese internees and Russians

Historian S. Kuznetsov, dean of the Department of History of the Irkutsk State University, one of the first researchers of the topic, interviewed thousands of former internees and came to the following conclusion:

However, many of the inmates do not share Kuznetsov's views and retain negative memories of being robbed of personal property, and the brutality of camp personnel, harsh winters and exhausting labor. One of these critics is Haruo Minami who later became one of the most famous singers in Japan. Minami, because of his harsh experiences in the labor camp, became a well-known anti-communist.

Most Japanese were captured in Soviet-occupied Manchuria (northeast China) and were taken to Soviet POW camps. Many Japanese died while they were detained in the POW camps; estimates of the number of these deaths vary from 60,000, based on deaths certified by the USSR, to 347,000 (the estimate of American historian William F. Nimmo, including 254,000 dead and 93,000 missing), based on the number of Japanese servicemen and civilian auxiliaries registered in Manchuria at the time of surrender who failed to return to Japan subsequently. Some remained in captivity until December 1956 (11 years after the war) before they were allowed to return to Japan. The wide disparity between Soviet records of death and the number of Japanese missing under Soviet occupation, as well as the whereabouts of the remains of POWs, are still grounds of political and diplomatic contention, at least on the Japanese side.

According to the map formulated by combining two maps, published by the former Ministry of Health and Welfare and the current Ministry of Labor, Health and Welfare of the Japanese Government, there were more than 70 labor camps for the Japanese prisoners of war within the Soviet Union:

Because of the difficulty in retrieving formal USSR Government records, the numerical data are based on reports obtained from former POWs and elsewhere by the former Ministry of Health and Welfare and the current Ministry of Labor, Health and Welfare of the Japanese Government. The Japanese Government is disinterring the remains of the Japanese POWs who died in the USSR; more data may be anticipated, for example, at sites such as

Japanese ex-internees today
Various associations of former internees seek compensation for their wartime treatment and for pensions from the Japanese government. An appeal to the Commission on Human Rights says

Those who chose to stay in Russia and eventually decided to return had to deal with significant Japanese bureaucracy. A major problem is the difficulty in providing the documentary confirmation of their status. Toshimasa Meguro, a 77-year-old former POW, was permitted to visit Japan as late as in 1998. He served eight years in labor camps and after his release, he was ordered to stay in Siberia.

Tetsuro Ahiko is the last remaining Japanese POW living in Kazakhstan.

Research in Russia
Research into the history of the Japanese POWs has become possible in Russia only since the second half of the 1980s, with glasnost and the dissolution of the Soviet Union. Until this time the only public information about any World War II POWs taken by the Soviet Union was some numbers of prisoners taken. After opening the secret Soviet archives the true scope of the POW labor in the Soviet Union has become known, and the topic has been discussed in the press.

Japanese POWs have become the subject of the historians of Siberia and the Russian Far East, who gained access to local archives of NKVD/MVD and CPSU A number of kandidat (PhD) dissertations had been presented about Soviet POW in various regions. In 2000 a fundamental collection of documents related to POWs in the USSR was published, which contained significant information about Japanese.

In the 2000s, several books about Japanese POWs were published in Russia.

About 2,000 memoirs of Japanese POWs in the Soviet Union have been published in Japan.

Legacy 
In 2015, records of the internment and repatriation were registered as a UNESCO Memory of the World under the title "Return to Maizuru Port—Documents Related to the Internment and Repatriation Experiences of Japanese (1945-1956)".

In fiction 
The Japanese novelist Toyoko Yamasaki wrote the 1976 novel Fumō Chitai, about an Imperial Army staff officer captured in Manchuria, his captivity and return to Japan to become a businessman. This has been made into a film and two television dramas.

A dramatisation of experiences as a Soviet POW form a portion of the latter part of the epic movie trilogy, The Human Condition, by Masaki Kobayashi.

Kiuchi Nobuo reported his experiences about Soviet camps in his The Notes of Japanese soldier in USSR online comic series.

The 2011 South Korean movie My Way also shows the treatment of Japanese and Japanese-recruited Koreans in Soviet POW camps.

See also
Japanese prisoners of war in World War II
Japanese Surrendered Personnel
Soviet invasion of Manchuria
Japanese people in Russia
German prisoners of war in the Soviet Union
Italian prisoners of war in the Soviet Union
Romanian prisoners of war in the Soviet Union
Finnish prisoners of war in the Soviet Union

References

Further reading
"Japanese POW in Primorye (1945–1949)"
Issue 1: "POW Labor in Coal Industry" ("Японские военнопленные в Приморье (1945–1949 гг.) Вып.1 Труд военнопленных в угольной промышленности" Владивосток: Государственный архив Приморского края, Мор. гос. ун-т им. адм. Г. И. Невельского) 2005.- 152 pp. 
Issue 2: "POW Labour in Various Spheres of the Notional Economy of the Primorsky Krai"(Японские военнопленные в Приморье (1945–1949 гг.) : документы Государственного архива Приморского края Выпуск 2: Труд военнопленных в отраслях народного хозяйства Приморского края, 2006 
Nicole Piper, "War and Memory: Victim Identity and the Struggle for Compensation in Japan" War & Society (2001) vol. 19, issue 1, pp. 131–148.

External links
The Notes of Japanese soldier in USSR
Historical time table of Japanese prisoners returning in 1945 – 1958 (in Japanese) (ソ連地域の引揚経緯表)
Japanese POWs in Siberia

Soviet Union
Japan
Military history of Japan during World War II
Mongolian People's Republic
Military history of Kazakhstan
Military history of Uzbekistan
Unfree labor during World War II
Unfree labor in the Soviet Union
Japan–Soviet Union relations
Soviet war crimes